Funa hadra is a species of sea snail, a marine gastropod mollusk in the family Pseudomelatomidae, the turrids and allies

Description
The length of the shell attains 45 mm.

Distribution
This marine species occurs off New Caledonia.

References

 Sysoev, A.; Bouchet, P. (2001). Gastéropodes turriformes (Gastropoda: Conoidea) nouveaux ou peu connus du Sud-Ouest Pacifique = New and uncommon turriform gastropods (Gastropoda: Conoidea) from the South-West Pacific. in: Bouchet, P. et al. (Ed.) Tropical deep-sea benthos. Mémoires du Muséum national d'Histoire naturelle. Série A, Zoologie. 185: 271-320

External links
 Bouchet, Philippe, et al. "A quarter-century of deep-sea malacological exploration in the South and West Pacific: where do we stand? How far to go." Tropical deep-sea Benthos 25 (2008): 9-40
 Specimen at MNHN, Paris
 
 

hadra
Gastropods described in 2001